Harley Balic (5 January 1997 – 9 January 2022) was a professional Australian rules footballer who played for the Fremantle Football Club in the Australian Football League (AFL).

Balic was born in Sandringham, Victoria. His father Eddie was of Bosnian descent and his mother Nancy was of Italian and German descent. Balic played for the Sandringham Dragons in the TAC Cup and was drafted by Fremantle with their second selection and 38th overall in the 2015 national draft. In 2016, he was a member of the Peel Thunder premiership team, collecting 20 disposals in the WAFL Grand Final.

After playing four games for the Dockers in 2017, he was placed on indefinite leave for "personal reasons". Later that year, Balic requested a trade home to Victoria and was traded to Melbourne in October. In August 2018 at the age of 21, Balic retired after losing passion for the game.

Balic died on 9 January 2022, four days after his 25th birthday.

Statistics
 Statistics are correct to the end of the 2018 season

|- style="background-color: #EAEAEA"
! scope="row" style="text-align:center" | 2016
|
| 24 || 0 || — || — || — || — || — || — || — || — || — || — || — || — || — || —
|-
! scope="row" style="text-align:center" | 2017
|
| 24 || 4 || 3 || 1 || 26 || 26 || 52 || 13 || 13 || 0.8 || 0.3 || 6.5 || 6.5 || 13.0 || 3.3 || 3.3
|- style="background-color: #EAEAEA"
! scope="row" style="text-align:center" | 2018
|
| 27 || 0 || — || — || — || — || — || — || — || — || — || — || — || — || — || —
|-
! colspan=3| Career
! 4
! 3
! 1
! 26
! 26
! 52
! 13
! 13
! 0.8
! 0.3
! 6.5
! 6.5
! 13.0
! 3.3
! 3.3
|}

References

External links

1997 births
2022 deaths
Australian people of Bosnia and Herzegovina descent
Australian people of German descent
Australian people of Italian descent
Australian rules footballers from Melbourne
Casey Demons players
Fremantle Football Club players
Peel Thunder Football Club players
Sandringham Dragons players
People from Sandringham, Victoria